Are You Experienced? is a novel  by William Sutcliffe, published in 1997. It is a pre-university gap year novel, in which a group of young Brits travel to India without really knowing what to expect or what to do there. It was rereleased by Penguin Essentials in 2017.

References

1997 British novels
Hamish Hamilton books
Novels set in India